Aran Fawddwy is a mountain in southern Snowdonia, Wales, United Kingdom. It is the highest point (county top) of the historic county of Merionethshire (for local government purposes, it lies within the current council area of Gwynedd). It is the highest peak in the Aran mountain range, the only peak in Wales outside North Snowdonia above 900m, and higher than anywhere in Great Britain outside Northern Snowdonia, the Scottish Highlands (and islands) and the Lake District. The nearest urban centres to the mountain are Dinas Mawddwy to the south, Llanymawddwy to the southeast, Llanuwchllyn on the shores of Bala Lake to the north, and Rhydymain to the west. 
The nearest settlements with around 2,000 people are Bala and Dolgellau. On the eastern slopes of Aran Fawddwy is the small lake named Creiglyn Dyfi, the source of the River Dyfi. There is also a middle peak- Erw y Ddafad-ddu.

Geography
Aran Fawddwy, which is only  short of being a member of the Welsh 3000s, is the highest peak in the Aran mountain range and the 16th highest summit in Wales. The other two Marilyns in this range are Glasgwm and Esgeiriau Gwynion.

It is the highest British mountain south of Snowdon and is the principal summit of the predominant southwest–northeast ridge between Dolgellau and Bala, southern Snowdonia, a ridge that continues westwards as Cadair Idris.

Ascent
Aran Fawddwy is best ascended from Cywarch in the south, although a longer ridge climb is possible from the Bala side. The mountain forms a long rocky ridge with Aran Fawddwy as the highest point, but Aran Benllyn as another notable summit. The eastern side is extremely steep, falling spectacularly in crags to a series of glacial cwms or corries which also enclose two small lakes (Creiglyn Dyfi and Llyn Lliwbran). The western slopes are also rocky, but less steep and more uniform. The view from the summit is extensive covering most of the mountain ranges of North Wales and as far south as the Brecon Beacons and Pembrokeshire peninsula. On an exceptionally clear day, the Lake District in England and Wicklow Mountains in Ireland are visible.

A cairn is placed on the eastern ridge as a memorial to RAF Mountain Rescue team member Michael Robert Aspain who was struck and killed by lightning in 1960.

See also
Geology of Snowdonia National Park

References

External links

 Computer-generated summit panoramas Aran Fawddwy Index
www.geograph.co.uk : photos of Aran Fawddwy and surrounding area

Marilyns of Wales
Hewitts of Wales
Nuttalls
Mountains and hills of Snowdonia
Landmarks in Wales
Highest points of Welsh counties
Mountains and hills of Gwynedd
Brithdir and Llanfachreth
Llanuwchllyn
Mawddwy